"Cross My Broken Heart" is a song written by Verlon Thompson and Kye Fleming, and recorded by American country music artist Suzy Bogguss.  It was released in June 1989 as the fourth single from the album Somewhere Between.  The song reached number 14 on the Billboard Hot Country Singles & Tracks chart.

Chart performance

References

1989 singles
Suzy Bogguss songs
Capitol Records Nashville singles
Songs written by Kye Fleming
Songs written by Verlon Thompson
1989 songs